Michael Logan Gonne Redhead  (30 December 1929 – 31 August 2020) was a British academic and philosopher of physics.

Biography
Redhead was born on 30 December 1929 in London and educated there at Westminster School.

Redhead was Centennial Professor in CPNSS (Centre for Philosophy of Natural and Social Science) at the London School of Economics and Political Science.

Redhead was an Emeritus Fellow of Wolfson College, Cambridge, and was Vice-President (1992–1996) and Acting President 1992 and 1993, Wolfson College, and formerly Head, CU Dept of History and Philosophy of Science.

He died on 31 August 2020 at the age of 90.

References

1929 births
2020 deaths
British philosophers
Philosophers of science
Fellows of the British Academy
Fellows of Wolfson College, Cambridge
Fellows of King's College London
Lakatos Award winners